Steven Joseph Seguin (born April 10, 1964) is a Canadian former professional ice hockey player. He played in 5 National Hockey League games with the Los Angeles Kings during the 1984–85 season. As a youth, he played in the 1977 Quebec International Pee-Wee Hockey Tournament with a minor ice hockey team from Cornwall.

Career statistics

Regular season and playoffs

References

External links
 

1964 births
Living people
Baltimore Skipjacks players
Canadian ice hockey right wingers
Hershey Bears players
Ice hockey people from Ontario
Kingston Canadians players
Los Angeles Kings draft picks
Los Angeles Kings players
New Haven Nighthawks players
Peterborough Petes (ice hockey) players
Sportspeople from Cornwall, Ontario